Fuga Island is an island and barangay located north of Luzon and is part of the Babuyan Islands, which is the second-northernmost island group of the Philippines. Barangay Fuga Island is one of the 42 barangays under the jurisdiction of the municipality of Aparri in the province of Cagayan.

Geography
The principal settlement is Naguilian (Musa) village on the southern coast.

Along with the neighbouring islets of Barit and Mabaag, it constitutes one of 42 barangays of the municipality of Aparri, Cagayan. It is the only one of the Babuyan Islands under the jurisdiction of a mainland municipality, whereas all other islands form the municipality of Calayan.

History
Presently, Fuga Island is owned by Fuga Island Holdings. It was formerly owned by the Dominican Order under the encomienda system during the Spanish Period eventually returned to the Filipinos after the signing of 1898 Treaty of Paris. The first land title was issued in 1908 under Original Certificate Title number two, and the Insular Government of the Philippine Islands designated the island and surrounding ports an economic zone as part of the Cagayan Special Economic Zone (CEZA) and Freeport under Republic Act No. 7922.

Archaeology
From January 31, 1978 to February 22, 1978, Bryan E. Snow and Richard Shutler, Jr. conducted an archaeological excavation on Fuga Moro Island. Only earthenware, pottery, porcelains, and stoneware were found during the excavation.

Military presence
On August 7, 2020, the Northern Luzon Command established a Marine detachment on the island. It also plans to build a defense facilities on the island, which will include a sheltered pier, a naval station, and a littoral monitoring on 20-hectare detachment.

See also

 List of islands of the Philippines

References

External links
Fuga Island at OpenStreetMap
Gma News Video, Isla Fuga

Babuyan Islands
Barangays of Cagayan